Walter Dwight Bradley (born October 30, 1946) is an American politician who served as the 27th lieutenant governor of the U.S. state of New Mexico under Governor Gary Johnson from 1995 through 2003.

Career 
Prior to his election as Lieutenant Governor, Bradley served in the New Mexico State Senate from 1989 to 1994. Bradley was preceded as lieutenant governor by Casey Luna and succeeded by Diane Denish. Bradley ran for Governor of New Mexico in 2002, but was defeated in the Republican primary by state Representative John Sanchez, who lost the general election to Bill Richardson.

He is currently working for the Dairy Farmers of America, Inc. as director of government and industry relations for the Southwestern United States.

References

Lieutenant Governors of New Mexico
Republican Party New Mexico state senators
Living people
1946 births